Ro 3-0412 is an acetylcholinesterase inhibitor. It is the organophosphate analog of neostigmine.

See also
Neostigmine
Ro 3-0419
Ro 3-0422

References

Acetylcholinesterase inhibitors
Organophosphates
Quaternary ammonium compounds
Phenol esters
Methyl esters
Methylsulfates